Guardian is the trademark name of a polymer originally manufactured by Securency International, a joint venture between the Reserve Bank of Australia and Innovia Films Ltd. The latter completed acquisition of the former's stake in 2013.

Its production involves gravity feeding a molten polymer, composed of extruded polypropylene and other polyolefins, through a four-storey chamber. This creates sheets of the substrate used as the base material by many central banks in the printing of polymer banknotes.

Production
Polypropylene is processed to create pellets. These pellets are extruded from a core extruder in conjunction with polyolefin pellets from two "skin layer" extruders, and are combined into a molten polymer. This consists of a 37.5µm thick polypropylene sheet sandwiched between two 0.1 µm polyolefin sheets, creating a thin film 37.7 µm thick.

The molten polymer undergoes snap cooling as it passes by gravity feeding through a brass mandrel, which imparts on the thin film many properties, including its transparency. The cast tube material is then reheated and blown into a large bubble using air pressure and temperature. At the base of the four-storey chamber convergence rollers collapse the tube into a flat sheet consisting of two layers of the thin film. This creates the base biaxially-oriented polypropylene substrate of 75.4 µm thickness, called ClarityC by Innovia Films.

The base substrate is slit as it exits the convergence rollers. A mask prevents the deposition of the opacifier on parts of the substrate that are intended to remain transparent. These overcoat layers protect the substrate from soiling and impart on it its characteristic texture, and increase the overall thickness to 87.5 µm. The resulting product is the Guardian substrate.

The opacifier conversion phase involves the use of resin and solvents, creating volatile organic compounds (VOCs) as by-products that are combusted in a thermal oxidizer. The resulting polymer substrate then passes through a rotary printing press using chrome-plated copper cylinders. After printing, the holographic security foil is incorporated into the base substrate. This is then cut into sheets and transported to the banknote printing companies in wooden boxes as a secure shipment.

Properties
Guardian is a non-porous and non-fibrous substrate. Because of this, it is "impervious to water and other liquids", and so remains clean for longer than a paper substrate. It is difficult to initiate a tear on the substrate, which has higher tear initiation resistance than paper.

Polymer banknotes
Guardian is used in the printing of polymer banknotes by many central banks.

It is the base material used for currencies printed by:

In 1993, the Bank of Indonesia issued a commemorative  banknote and the Central Bank of Kuwait issued a د.ك1 banknote. In 1998, the Bank Negara Malaysia issued a commemorative  banknote, and the Central Bank of Sri Lanka issued a commemorative Rs200 banknote. In 1999, the Northern Bank of Northern Ireland issued a commemorative  banknote, and the Central Bank of the Republic of China in Taiwan issued a commemorative  banknote. In 2000, the Central Bank of Brazil issued a commemorative  banknote and the People's Bank of China issued a commemorative ¥100 banknote. In 2001, the Central Bank of Solomon Islands issued a commemorative SI$2 banknote. In 2009, the Bank of Mexico issued a commemorative $100 banknote.

Notes

References

Further reading

Polymers
Brand name materials